Adoni is a city in the Kurnool district in the Indian state of Andhra Pradesh. It is a municipality and the headquarters of Adoni mandal, administered under the Adoni Revenue Division. In the 2011 census of India, Adoni had a population of 166,344, making it the 15th most populous town in the state with an urban agglomeration population of 184,625.

History 
The Adoni fort is central to the town's history. In 1780, an observer wrote,
"Adoni is situated upon three mountains which are united; it has a range of irregular fortifications, piled one over the other. To maintain it requires a garrison of 30,000 men. The fortifications upon the mountains are often weak...To the south of Adoni, a large plain, to the north there are mountains, obnoxious from their nearness, to the east there are other mountains. To the west there are also mountains and this part is the weakest."

It is thought to have been founded by Chandra Sen in 1200 BC and later came into the medieval kingdom of Vijayanagar which flourished from the 14th to the 16th centuries. The fort then became the stronghold of the Muslim kings of the Adil Shahi dynasty of Bijapur and Golconda. In 1690 the fort was taken by Aurangzeb then in the late 18th century it came to the Raja of Mysore, Tipu Sultan before it was ceded to the British in 1799.
In the 15th century and early to mid 16th century, Adoni was a fort town of the Vijayanagara Empire. It was controlled by the kinsmen of Aliya Rama Raya, a powerful aristocrat of the Vijayanagara.

In 1558, during the decline of the Vijayanagara Empire, control of Adoni came to Ali Adil Shah I (1558–1579), the fifth Sultan of the Bijapur Sultanate. Hamilton, in 1820, stated,
"It [Adoni at this time] stood at the top of a high hill, and contained within its walls many tanks and fountains of pure water with numerous princely structures."

In 1564, the Sultanate of Bijapur lost control of Adoni to Mohammedan rulers.

From 1678 to 1688, rule of Adoni lay with Siddi Masud, a wealthy Habshi (African) from Abyssinia who was a powerful general of Raja Anup Singh of Bikaner, Siddi Masud improved the fort; cleared the surrounding forest; established the townships of Imatiazgadh and Adilabad and constructed the Shahi Jamia Masjid. Siddi Masud was also an avid art collector and a patron of the Kurnool school of painting. In 1688, Adoni was attacked by Firuz Jang, a Mughal general. Siddi Musud surrendered with his courtiers and family.

At the fall of the Mughal Empire, around 1760, Adoni was ruled by governors appointed by the Nizam of Hyderabad, a Mughal splinter clan. One such governor was Salabat Jung, brother of the Nizam. The French supported the appointment. However,

"Salabat Jung was very mild by disposition and neither Bussy nor Dupleix rated his intelligence highly. In fact, Dupleix went to the extent of calling him a duffer."

In 1786, Adoni was besieged for one month and then captured by Tipu Sultan of the Kingdom of Mysore of South India. On 4 May 1799, Tipu Sultan died at the hands of the English. On 15 June 1800, Arthur Wellesley, Marquess of Wellington, wrote to the resident at Hyderabad about appropriate reparations to the Nizam for English occupation of Adoni. Adoni became one of twenty taluqs and in 1810, the Adoni and Nagaldinna taluqs were combined. In 1817 Adoni, at the beginning of the Third Anglo-Maratha War, the British raised a new battalion from other nearby regiments. By 1842, the military had left Adoni because of the perception that the area was susceptible to cholera and because of the unfavourable rugged surrounding geography. Under British rule, South India was divided into several administrative districts. Adoni fell into the district of Bellary of Madras presidency. On 29 April 1861, the acting district engineer of Kurnool wrote to the chief secretary to government at Fort St George,
"North and by east of Bellary, on the Hyderabad road, the only important town is Adoni; it contains a very large population of Mussulmen, and is a place of considerable trade and manufacture."
In 1867, the Adoni and the Bellary Municipal Councils were created. Between 1876 and 1878, a severe El Nino famine affected Adoni and the surrounding areas where nearly one third of the population died.
In 1953, after the linguistic reorganisation of the states, Adoni gained its present seat as part of Andhra Pradesh.

Geography 

The climate is mainly tropical, with temperatures from 31 °C to 45 °C in summer and 21 °C to 29 °C in winter.
The soil is black and red. There are large limestone deposits suitable for cement and minerals such as copper, lead, zinc and in some places, diamonds.

Demographics 

The total population constituted  males and  females. These numbers produced a gender ratio of 1013 females per 1000 males, which was higher than the national average of 940 per 1000. In the same year,  children were between 0 and 6 years of age. The average literacy rate was 68.38 percent with  literate people. This number was significantly lower than the national average of 73 percent.

The urban agglomeration had a population of 184,771, of which 92,006 were male and 92,765 were female, giving a gender ratio of 1008 females per 1000 males. Children aged 0 to 6 years numbered 20,517. There were 112,151 literate people giving an average literacy rate of 68.28 percent.

Telugu is an official language of the city. Kannada and Urdu are also widely spoken.

Economy 
Adoni is an important trading center with a large market situated in the center of the town. Adoni is a large producer of cotton and has a substantial ginning and textile industry. The next most important industry is groundnut oil. Adoni is an important trading center in Andhra Pradesh with a large market situated in the center of the town.

Landmarks 

Historical Adoni Fort, the historic Sri Ranamandla Konda and Shri Renuka Yellamma temples, Ramjala, Shahi Jamia Masjid.

Road

NH 167 passes through the city of Adoni.
APSRTC operates buses from the Adoni bus station.

Rail 
The Adoni railway station and its connections were built during British rule in 1870 and is now a part of the South Central Railway on the Solapur-Guntakal line which is part of Bengaluru-Mumbai, Chennai-Mumbai line.

Education 
The primary and secondary school education is administered by the government and supplemented by private schools, under the School Education Department of the state. The language of instruction followed by schools are English, Telugu, Kannada and Urdu

Degree Colleges names they are 1.The Adoni Arts and Science College 2.Sai Degree College 3.Dr.Jyothirmayi Degree College.

Engineering College name is Bheema Institute of Technology and Science (BITS) .

Entertainment

Movies 

 Satyam
 Shivam
 Raj
 Raj Shree
 Dwaraka Screen 1
 Dwaraka Screen 2
 Dwaraka Screen 3
 Sai Baba
 Prabhakar Theatre

See also 
 List of cities in Andhra Pradesh by population
 List of municipalities in Andhra Pradesh

References

External links 

Cities in Andhra Pradesh
Mandal headquarters in Kurnool district